The 1999–2000 OGC Nice season was the club's 96th season in existence and the third consecutive season in the top flight of French football. In addition to the domestic league, Nice participated in this season's editions of the Coupe de France and the Coupe de la Ligue. The season covers the period from 1 July 1999 to 30 June 2000.

Pre-season and friendlies

Competitions

Overview

French Division 2

League table

Results summary

Results by round

Matches

Source:

Coupe de France

Coupe de la Ligue

Statistics

Goalscorers

References

OGC Nice seasons
Nice